The 1999 Peach Bowl featured the Clemson Tigers and Mississippi State Bulldogs.

After a scoreless first half, Mississippi State scored first on a 39-yard Scott Westerfield field goal, taking a 3–0 lead. In the fourth quarter, Wayne Madkin scored on a 2-yard touchdown run increasing the lead to 10–0. Clemson's Brandon Streeter responded with a 1-yard scoring run making it 10–7. Madkin's 15 yard touchdown pass to Dontae Walker gave MSU the 17–7 win.

References

Peach Bowl
Peach Bowl
Clemson Tigers football bowl games
Mississippi State Bulldogs football bowl games
Peach Bowl
Peach Bowl
Peach Bowl